Hughson Union High School serves students from the rural community of Hughson, California, as well as the outer towns of Hickman, California and La Grange, California.

Athletics
Hughson Union High School belongs to the Trans Valley League in the Sac-Joaquin Section of the California Interscholastic Federation. The school's teams, known as the Hughson Huskies, compete in baseball, basketball, cross country, football, golf, soccer, softball, tennis, track, volleyball, and wrestling.

Notable alumni
Paul Stine (1957), victim of the Zodiac Killer

References

External links
Hughson High School Home Page

Educational institutions established in 1911
High schools in Stanislaus County, California
Public high schools in California
1911 establishments in California